Promised Land is a 2012 American drama film directed by Gus Van Sant and starring Matt Damon, John Krasinski, Frances McDormand, Rosemarie DeWitt and Hal Holbrook. The screenplay is written by Damon and Krasinski based on a story by Dave Eggers. Promised Land follows two petroleum landmen who visit a rural town in an attempt to buy drilling rights from the local residents.

Damon was originally attached to direct the film, but he was replaced by Van Sant. Filming took place mainly in Pittsburgh from early to mid-2012. During filming and afterward, the film's highlighting of the resource extraction process hydraulic fracturing, known as "fracking," emerged as a topic of debate.

The film had its international premiere and received Special Mention Award at the 63rd Berlin International Film Festival in February 2013. It received mixed reviews from critics, although the National Board of Review named it one of the top ten films of 2012, and was a box office bomb, grossing just $8 million against a $15 million budget.

Plot
Steve Butler has caught the eyes of top management at his employer, Global Crosspower Solutions, an energy company that specializes in obtaining natural gas trapped underground through a process known as fracking. Butler has an excellent track record for quickly and cheaply persuading land owners to sign mineral rights leases that grant drilling rights over to his employer. Butler and his partner Sue Thomason arrive in an economically struggling Pennsylvania farming town whose citizens are proud of having family farms passed from one generation to the next.

Coming from a town and a life very similar to that of the people he is now determined to win over on behalf of Global, Butler tells the story of how his own town died after the local Caterpillar assembly plant closed. The idea of a town surviving solely on family farms being passed down through generations as a viable economy is one that he can no longer accept. He claims to be offering the town its last chance. Butler spends some pleasant after-hours time with Alice, a teacher he meets in a bar.

The community seems willing to accept Global's offer, until an elderly, local high school science teacher, Frank Yates, who happened to be a successful engineer in his working life, raises the question of the safety of fracking during a town meeting. It's decided that the people will vote in a few weeks whether or not to take the offer. After hearing about the vote, Dustin Noble, an unknown environmental advocate, starts a grassroots campaign against Global, motivated by a tale of his family losing its Nebraska dairy farm after the herd died as a result of Global's industry-standard fracking process.

Butler begins to meet a great deal of resistance in town. Noble seems to be winning over nearly everyone, including Alice. One night Butler receives a package from Global that includes an enlarged copy of a photograph of dead cattle on a field that Noble said came from his family's Nebraska farm. The enlargement shows that an object thought to be a silo is, in fact, a lighthouse, which are nonexistent in Nebraska, revealing that Noble fabricated his story and deceived the people. The picture was actually taken in Lafayette, Louisiana, where Global is in the midst of a lawsuit over environmental complications that were probably caused by their fracking practices.

Butler informs the town's mayor of the deception, who then informs the rest of the town. He returns to the hotel to find Noble loading his truck, preparing to leave town. Noble accidentally reveals that he knows the picture with the lighthouse was taken in Lafayette. Butler realizes the only way Noble could have known this information is if he were also employed by Global, and that Noble's job had been to discredit the environmental movement and convince the town to vote in favor of Global's offer. He arranged for Butler to receive the "confidential" photos and engineered the entire public relations effort.

At a town meeting the next day, the citizens are prepared to vote on Global's efforts to buy drilling rights to their property. Butler talks to them about how the barn in the picture reminds him of his grandfather's barn. He reveals that Noble has manipulated them and is employed by Global. Butler leaves the meeting to find Thomason on the phone with Global. She tells him he's fired and that she is leaving for New York. Butler walks to Alice's home and she welcomes him in.

Cast

Production
Promised Land is directed by Gus Van Sant based on a screenplay by Matt Damon and John Krasinski, who are film producers along with Chris Moore. In interviews, Krasinski and Damon said that the idea for the movie was partially inspired by an investigative series of stories in The New York Times by Ian Urbina, called "Drilling Down", about fracking. The screenplay was based on a story by Dave Eggers. Krasinski came up with the film's premise and developed the idea with Eggers. They pitched the idea to Damon, suggesting that both Damon and Krasinski would write and star in the film. The project was set up at Warner Bros. with Damon attached as director in October 2011, in what would have been his directorial debut. Filming was scheduled to begin in early 2012.

In January 2012, Damon stepped down as director due to scheduling conflicts but remained involved with the project. Damon contacted Gus Van Sant, who directed him in the 1997 film Good Will Hunting, and Van Sant joined the project as director. The project was in turnaround at Warner Bros., and by February, Focus Features and Participant Media acquired rights to produce the film. The title was announced to be Promised Land. The Commonwealth of Pennsylvania provided the production company  in tax credits since filming would provide jobs and revenue. More than eighty percent of the crew were hired out of Pittsburgh. Filming mostly took place in Avonmore, Pennsylvania, which was the main setting for the film's rural town of McKinley. Additional filming locations for the town were locations in Armstrong County including Apollo, Worthington, and Slate Lick. Other filming locations in Pennsylvania were Alexandria, Delmont, Export, and West Mifflin. Filming also took place at the Grand Concourse at Station Square in Pittsburgh.

The film score was composed by Danny Elfman. Three songs by The Milk Carton Kids including Snake Eyes, The Ash & Clay and Jewel of June were also written for the film.

Oil industry controversy
Promised Land was criticized by the energy industry for its portrayal of the resource extraction process hydraulic fracturing, colloquially known as "fracking". The portrayal was first reported in April 2012 by filmmakers raising funds for the pro-fracking documentary FrackNation. They said, "Promised Land will increase unfounded concerns about fracking." Phelim McAleer, the director of  FrackNation, said Dimock, Pennsylvania was the likely inspiration for Promised Land. McAleer said despite Dimock families' claims that fracking activity contaminated their water, the state and EPA scientists did not find anything wrong. In September 2012, CNBC reported that a group of residents from Armstrong County, Pennsylvania were protesting the film and formed a Facebook group. The group said, "They filmed this movie in our backyard. They told us it would be fair to drilling. It’s not. We’re p*ssed [sic]." Mike Knapp, one of the organizers of the Facebook group said, "One of the things that really aggravates me, is that they seem to have a very condescending view" of farmers as portrayed in the film.

Krasinski, who co-wrote the screenplay and plays Dustin, said the film's original premise involved wind power. Krasinski said wind power was replaced by fracking as a more relevant backdrop based on news coverage in recent years. The Huffington Post reported, "The procedure has caused concern due in part to the chemicals injected into the wells for drilling, which may taint nearby drinking water." It said Damon had posted in 2010 a YouTube video to promote the Working Families Party, which works "to prevent risky natural gas drilling". Politico said Promised Land reflected a trend about fracking since the release of the 2010 documentary film Gasland, which was nominated for an Academy Award for Best Documentary.

Leading up to the film's release, a spokesperson for Independent Petroleum Association of America said, "We have to address the concerns that are laid out in these types of films." The industry planned to send scientific studies to film critics, to distribute leaflets to film audiences, and to use social media like Facebook and Twitter as a response to the film. Where the industry launched "direct attacks" at Gasland, it instead sought to portray Promised Land as "derivative, condescending and clichéd". In Pennsylvania, the industry group Marcellus Shale Coalition bought a 16-second onscreen ad to be shown at 75 percent of theaters in the state at the same time Promised Land was released.

James Schamus, chief executive of the film's distributor Focus Features said, "We've been surprised at the emergence of what looks like a concerted campaign targeting the film even before anyone's seen it." As the film was released, he said, "Fracking is a great premise for real drama. It represents Americans deeply conflicted about how to deal with these issues." He compared the industry's stealth campaign against the film to the one depicted within the film.

Release

Theatrical run
For the opening weekend, Promised Land grossed an estimated $190,000. Box Office Mojo reported before the film's wide release the following week, "It's unlikely that it will be able to pull many people away from the various other appealing options in theaters right now." It grossed  over the weekend, which the Los Angeles Times judged as "a bad start" even with its  budget. Audiences polled by CinemaScore gave the film a "B" average grade on an A+ to F scale. The Los Angeles Times said the grade and "middling reviews" indicated the film was unlikely to be a success. By the end of its theatrical run, the film grossed $12.3 million.

The film had its international premiere at the 63rd Berlin International Film Festival in February 2013 where Gus Van Sant won a Special Mention.

Critical reception
Promised Land received mixed reviews from critics. On Rotten Tomatoes the film has an approval rating of 53%, based on 154 reviews, with an average rating of 5.90/10. The website's critical consensus reads, "The earnest and well-intentioned Promised Land sports a likable cast, but it also suffers from oversimplified characterizations and a frustrating final act." Metacritic gave the film a weighted average score of 55 out of 100, based on 36 critics, indicating "mixed or average reviews". The Los Angeles Times reported that most critics felt that the film did not reach its full potential.

New York Times film critic A.O. Scott praised Promised Land as a film that "works" mainly "by putting character ahead of story" and by "inviting the actors to be warm, funny and prickly".  Liam Lacey of The Globe and Mail is critical of the film: "Apart from its warm, gentle tone, much about Promised Land simply isn't good, especially the inconsistencies in the screenplay. After the mood-setting first half, things start to unravel."

Accolades

References

External links
 
 
 
 
 
 Promised Land informational page at TakePart

2012 films
2012 drama films
American drama films
2010s English-language films
Environmental films
Film controversies in the United States
Film controversies in the United Arab Emirates
Films directed by Gus Van Sant
Films set in Pennsylvania
Films shot in Pittsburgh
Focus Features films
Hydraulic fracturing
Films with screenplays by John Krasinski
Films with screenplays by Matt Damon
Films produced by Matt Damon
Films scored by Danny Elfman
Participant (company) films
Pearl Street Films films
2010s American films